Martin Murphy may refer to:

Martin Murphy (civil engineer) (1832–1926), Irish-born Canadian civil engineer
Martin Murphy (rugby league), English rugby league footballer of the 1960s, 1970s and 1980s
Martin Murphy (politician) (1862–1919), Irish nationalist MP for East Waterford 1913–18
Martin Murphy of Mental As Anything

See also